Álom.net, also known as Dream Well, is a 2009 Hungarian romantic comedy film written and directed by Gábor N. Forgács. It was panned by critics, with some considering it to be one of the worst films ever made.

Synopsis
Regina, the once popular girl has to make new friends at her new, conservative school. Problems arrive when she becomes enemies with Lívia, the school's queen bee, and falls in love with Márk, a musician. If these weren't enough, she decides to organize a cheerleader team.

Cast
Lilla Labanc as Regina
Kinga Czifra as Lívia
Ádám Csernóczki as Márk
Attila Jankóczky as Dávid
István Széni as Gábor
János Szücs as Tomi
Zoli Ádok as Geri
Arnold Tarsoly as Pityu
Dorottya Farsang as Vivien
Eszter Iszak as Szandra
Ottília Lerch as Laura
Petra F. Tóth as Andrea
Laura Marsi as Orsa
Kristóf Steiner as Krisztián
Ildikó Incze as Katalin
Pál Oberfrank as András
István Tamási as Ricsi
Bence Balázs as Niko
Richárd Reiter as Szabi
Szandra Szabó  as Detti
Zsófi Komáromi as Alíz
Réka Nádai as Krisztina
Gábor Reviczky as School principal
Károly Rékasi  as Mr. Károly
Éva Mészáros as Auntie Ica
Ágnes Bánfalvy as Márta

Reception
Álom.net was widely panned by viewers for its poor writing, acting, problems with continuity, and cultural inaccuracy, among others. 444.hu wrote that it is "the worst movie of all time, and that’s why it became a cult film". Furthermore, 24.hu and Index.hu each named it the worst Hungarian film ever made, and it gained international notoriety by becoming the lowest rated film on IMDb's Bottom 100 list in 2011. British film magazine Total Film named it the fourth worst film ever made and FMC.hu included it on their list of the ten worst films ever made. Origo called it "one of the worst Hungarian films of [the decade]".

Proposed sequel
In 2014, a Facebook page was created which encouraged fans to support Álom.net 2.

See also
List of films considered the worst

References

External links 
 
 

2009 films
2009 romantic comedy films
Hungarian romantic comedy films